Jenny Lives with Eric and Martin, originally Mette bor hos Morten og Erik, is a black-and-white picture book by the Danish author Susanne Bösche, published in 1981 in Danish and in 1983 by Gay Men's Press. It was perhaps the first English-language children's book to discuss male homosexuality. Jane Severance's When Megan Went Away (1979) preceded Jenny Lives with Eric and Martin.

Plot
The story describes a few days in the life of a five-year-old named Jenny, her father, Martin, and his boyfriend Eric who lives with them. Jenny's mother Karen lives nearby and often visits the household.

The book covers such small adventures as
 Jenny, Eric and Martin going to the laundrette together
 Jenny, Martin and Karen preparing a surprise birthday party for Eric
 Eric and Martin having a small quarrel and making up
 A woman expressing homophobic disgust when passing the family in the street. This is the subject of a later discussion between Eric and Jenny.

Purpose
Bösche has spoken of her motivation in writing the book:

Bosche asserts that she had no idea her book would stir up such controversy. She said that "I didn't know people would have that negative reaction. It was very sad what happened at that time." Also, the book was originally published in Denmark and there was no backlash against it there. Despite these intentions, the book has been categorized as "homosexual propaganda" by the tabloid press in the UK, which has led to much of its influence and even notoriety.

Political influence
In 1986 various newspapers reported that a copy of the book was provided in the library of a school run by the Labour-controlled Inner London Education Authority (ILEA). A complaint was made to the Press Council regarding the press coverage as the book had not actually been made available to children, but only one copy had been purchased and made available to teachers through the Isledon Teachers Centre. The Education Authority had not approved it for younger children, and it was only supposed to be shown to older children "in exceptional circumstances" and following consultation with parents.

The availability of the book was condemned by Kenneth Baker, the Secretary of State for Education. In response to Baker's intervention, Frances Morrell, the leader of ILEA, said that the very limited use of the book in local authority schools was consistent with the government's requirements on sex education.

The resulting controversy made a major contribution towards the then Conservative administration's subsequent passing of the controversial Section 28 of the Local Government Act 1988, which forbade the promotion of homosexuality by local government (an article about Section 28 in The Times of May 29, 1988, notes the then-current notoriety of the book). This conservative backlash was partially motivated by a wave of homophobia in Britain that had been spurred on by the public's growing fear of HIV/AIDS. Much of the conservative outrage against the book stemmed from issues that conservatives had with the photos used to illustrate the book. These were photos of Bosche's daughter with two of her friends who lived in the same building.

In the United States in the 1990s, Heather Has Two Mommies became a similarly politicised book.

References

1981 non-fiction books
1980s LGBT literature
Children's books with LGBT themes
Danish non-fiction books
LGBT-related controversies in literature